Alyy Khan (or Aly Khan, ; born 6 December 1968) is a British-Pakistani actor and host who has worked in Hollywood, Bollywood and Lollywood films and television series. 

He is known for his roles in the films A Mighty Heart (2007), Traitor (2008), Don 2 (2011), 3 Bahadur (2015), Actor in Law (2016) and Mogul Mowgli (2020), and also played a parallel lead in the telefilm Anjuman (2013). 

Khan has also appeared in several television series, including The Bill (2006), Strike Back (2011), Saat Pardon Mein (2012), Indian Summers (2015) and Pakeezah (2016). 

In 2012, Khan hosted the television reality show Foodistan for NDTV and Geo TV. 

Recent credits include The Serpent (2020) on Netflix, Shantaram (2022) Paramount/Apple + TV and The Archie's (2022) Netflix India.

Early life 
Born in Karachi in Pakistan, when he was nine his family moved to London, UK, while he also attended school in Mumbai, India, where his mother still resides, later earning a diploma in Film and Television Production from London’s Pimlico Arts and Media College. 
  
The late singer-turned-Islamic preacher Junaid Jamshed was his cousin.

Filmography

Television

References

External links
 
 Alyy Khan on the Hollywood

Living people
1968 births
British male film actors
British male television actors
Pakistani male film actors
Pakistani male television actors
Pakistani television hosts
Male actors from London
Male actors in Hindi cinema
British expatriates in India
British expatriate actors in India
Pakistani expatriate male actors in India
Pakistani male voice actors
British film actors of Pakistani descent
Pakistani emigrants to the United Kingdom
Naturalised citizens of the United Kingdom